The Houcheng Formation is a geological formation in Hebei, China whose strata date back to the Upper Middle Jurassic. The lithology primarily consists of sandstone and conglomerate deposited in fluvial, alluvial fan and fan delta conditions, with interbeds of volcanic rocks. Dinosaur remains are among the fossils that have been recovered from the formation.

Vertebrate paleofauna

See also 

 List of dinosaur-bearing rock formations

References 

Geologic formations of China
Jurassic System of Asia
Jurassic China
Paleontology in Hebei
Callovian Stage